The McMullen problem is an open problem in discrete geometry named after Peter McMullen.

Statement
In 1972, David G. Larman wrote about the following problem:

Larman credited the problem to a private communication by Peter McMullen.

Equivalent formulations

Gale transform
Using the Gale transform, this problem can be reformulated as:

Partition into nearly-disjoint hulls
Also, by simple geometric observation, it can be reformulated as:

Projective duality

The equivalent projective dual statement to the McMullen problem is to determine the largest number  such that every set of  hyperplanes in general position in d-dimensional real projective space form an arrangement of hyperplanes in which one of the cells is bounded by all of the hyperplanes.

Results
This problem is still open.
David Larman proved in 1972 that 
Michel Las Vergnas proved in 1986 that 
Jorge Luis Ramírez Alfonsín proved in 2001 that 
The conjecture of this problem is that .

References

Discrete geometry
Unsolved problems in geometry